Pentamerous Metamorphosis is an album by Global Communication originally released in 1993 on Dedicated Records. It is a reworking of the Blood Music album by Chapterhouse and was originally only available as a bonus CD bundled with the Chapterhouse album.  It was rereleased as a standalone album in 1998.

Track listing
1993 Original
"Alpha Phase" – 16:39
"Beta Phase" – 10:49      (mainly a remix of Chapterhouse's Don't Look Now)
"Gamma Phase" – 11:45      (mainly a remix of Chapterhouse's There's Still Life and Deli)
"Delta Phase" – 10:41      (mainly a remix of Chapterhouse's We Are the Beautiful)
"Epsilon Phase" – 11:18    (mainly a remix Chapterhouse's Love Forever)

1998 Remaster/Reissue
"Alpha Phase" – 16:47
"Beta Phase" – 10:46
"Gamma Phase" – 11:50
"Delta Phase" – 10:14
"Epsilon Phase" – 11:26

Notes
The 1998 re-release was remastered and had minor changes to two tracks: (Beta Phase) to remove an uncleared sample from the film Return of the Jedi and (Delta Phase) was shortened by eight bars.

The removed sample:

EV-9D9: "How many languages do you speak?"
C-3PO: "I am fluent in over six million forms of communication"

Though the album is ostensibly a remix album, very little of the unremixed Chapterhouse music remains intact in the remixed tracks, with at most one or two samples clearly recognizable on each track.

Mark Pritchard commenting on the difference between the original '93 release and the '98 re-release at Reload Online said "yeah, the difference was no c3po (in the intro of original beta phase) as things were getting a little hot with the jedi knights thing, and one of the tracks has 8 bars edited out of it. i think it was track 4 (delta phase)"

Tom Middleton commenting on the creation of Pentamerous Metamorphosis in the liner notes to the 76:14 album remaster/reissue said "One day we got a call from Andy Sheriff from Chapterhouse who loved our work, and asked if we wanted to remix their entire album? What an amazing opportunity. Sampling from the multi-track tapes, embellishing the themes and distilling the lyrical content from Blood Music into five new pieces. The result was Pentamerous Metamorphosis."

References

External links

1993 albums
Global Communication albums
Dedicated Records albums